Cosi Fan Tutti Frutti is a 1985 album by the British new wave group Squeeze. It is the band's sixth album, and the first recorded since their breakup in 1982. It reunited songwriters Glenn Tilbrook and Chris Difford with drummer Gilson Lavis and keyboardist Jools Holland (now credited as "Julian"). Keith Wilkinson, who played bass on the 1984 Difford & Tilbrook album, joined Squeeze for the first time. He would stay with the band for over a decade, making him the longest-lasting bassist in Squeeze's history. Laurie Latham produced the album. The album peaked at number 31 on the UK Albums Chart.

The album's title is a play on words, combining the name of the Mozart Italian-language opera Così fan tutte with the name of the Italian confection tutti-frutti (also the name of a Little Richard song). The album's cover art expands this into a visual pun, with a picture of a tea cozy (cosi), a fan, and a tutti-frutti dessert.

In 1997, the CD was released in the UK with two bonus tracks, as part of the Six of One... box set. The set included the band's first six studio albums, each digitally remastered. These CDs were made available for purchase in 1998.

Curiously, the 1997 remaster used the shorter versions of the songs originally issued on vinyl and not the longer versions issued on the first CD.

Reception

Chris Woodstra of AllMusic summarised Cosi Fan Tutti Frutti as "flawed but worthwhile", commenting that although " history and a dated production style haven't been particularly kind to the album", the end result was "not without its merits".

Track listing
All songs written by Chris Difford and Glenn Tilbrook except as indicated. The time listed in parenthesis indicates the version used on the 1997 remaster.
 "Big Beng" – 4:04 (4:03)
 "By Your Side" – 4:24 (4:24)
 "King George Street" – 3:48 (3:48)
 "I Learnt How to Pray" – 4:47 (4:24)
 "Last Time Forever" – 6:26 (5:41)
 "No Place Like Home" – 4:27 (4:27)
 "Heartbreaking World" (Difford, Jools Holland) – 5:27 (5:07)
 "Hits of the Year" – 3:03 (3:03)
 "Break My Heart" – 4:52 (4:34)
 "I Won't Ever Go Drinking Again (?)" – 5:07 (4:38)

Bonus tracks (1997 reissue)
"Love's a Four Letter Word" – 3:41
 "The Fortnight Saga" – 2:41

Personnel
Squeeze
 Chris Difford – guitars, backing vocals, lead vocals (9)
 Glenn Tilbrook – guitars, tambourine, lead and backing vocals
 Jools Holland – keyboards, backing vocals, lead vocals (7)
 Keith Wilkinson – bass, backing vocals
 Gilson Lavis – drums, electronic drums, backing vocals 

Additional personnel
 Ian Kewley – E-mu Emulator (7)
 Christopher Holland – organ (7)
 Hearts of Soul – backing vocals (4)

Production
 Laurie Latham – producer, engineer 
 Erwin Autrique – additional engineer 
 Michel Dierickx – additional engineer
 Frank DeLuna – remastering at A&M Mastering Studios (Hollywood, California, US)
 Rob O'Connor – art direction, design 
 Michael Ross – art direction
 Simon Fell – illustration 
 Nick Knight – group photography 
 Trevor Rogers – inner sleeve photography

Charts

References

1985 albums
Squeeze (band) albums
A&M Records albums
Albums produced by Laurie Latham